The 1969 Icelandic Cup was the 10th edition of the National Football Cup.

It took place between 12 July 1969 and 7 December 1969, with the final played at Melavöllur in Reykjavik. The cup was important, as winners qualified for the UEFA Cup Winners' Cup (if a club won both the league and the cup, the defeated finalists would take their place in the Cup Winners' Cup). Teams from the Úrvalsdeild karla (1st division) did not enter until the quarter finals. In prior rounds, teams from the 2. Deild (2nd division), as well as reserve teams, played in one-legged matches. In case of a draw, lots were drawn. From the semi-finals, after a replay, lots were drawn.

ÍBA Akureyri, who had a terrible season in the 1. Deild, won their first ever Icelandic Cup, and so qualified for Europe. In another first, the final was replayed after the first match was drawn 1-1.

First round

Second round 

 Entrance of Hamar Hveragerði, HSH, UMF Selfoss and the reserve teams from Fram Reykjavik B, IA Akranes B, Breiðablik Kopavogur B and FH Hafnarfjörður B.

Third round 

 Entrance of 7 clubs from 1. Deild

Quarter finals

Semi finals

Final 

 ÍBA Akureyri won their first Icelandic Cup and qualified for the 1970–71 European Cup Winners' Cup.

See also 

 1969 Úrvalsdeild
 Icelandic Cup

External links 
  1998 Icelandic Cup results at the site of the Icelandic Football Federation

Icelandic Men's Football Cup
Iceland
1969 in Iceland